Nuevo (Spanish for "New") is a rural community located east of Lake Perris and the city of Perris in Riverside County, California. The population of the census-designated place (CDP) is 7,033 according to the 2020 census, up from 6,447 at the 2010 census.

Geography
Nuevo is located at  (33.807027, -117.128585).

According to the United States Census Bureau, the CDP has a total area of 6.8 square miles (17.5 km), all of it land.

The geography of the area consists of a wide variety of geographical features, including rocky and rolling hills and low-lying valleys. The usually dry San Jacinto River runs along the northern portion of the area.

The natural vegetation consists primarily of Coastal Sage Scrub, though much of this natural vegetation is visibly absent or exists in remnant form within the lowlands of the area where residential and agricultural uses are most prevalent.

Demographics

2010
The 2010 United States Census reported that Nuevo had a population of 6,447. The racial makeup of Nuevo was 4,011 (62.2%) White, 113 (1.8%) African American, 91 (1.4%) Native American, 82 (1.3%) Asian, 16 (0.2%) Pacific Islander, 1,810 (28.1%) from other races, and 324 (5.0%) from two or more races. Hispanic or Latino of any race were 3,514 persons (54.5%).

The Census reported that 6,445 people (100% of the population) lived in households, 2 (0%) lived in non-institutionalized group quarters, and 0 (0%) were institutionalized.

There were 1,795 households, out of which 872 (48.6%) had children under the age of 18 living in them, 1,178 (65.6%) were opposite-sex married couples living together, 204 (11.4%) had a female householder with no husband present, 122 (6.8%) had a male householder with no wife present.  There were 101 (5.6%) unmarried opposite-sex partnerships, and 12 (0.7%) same-sex married couples or partnerships. 219 households (12.2%) were made up of individuals, and 80 (4.5%) had someone living alone who was 65 years of age or older. The average household size was 3.59.  There were 1,504 families (83.8% of all households); the average family size was 3.87.

The population was spread out, with 1,935 people (30.0%) under the age of 18, 690 people (10.7%) aged 18 to 24, 1,593 people (24.7%) aged 25 to 44, 1,615 people (25.1%) aged 45 to 64, and 614 people (9.5%) who were 65 years of age or older.  The median age was 32.9 years. For every 100 females, there were 100.6 males.  For every 100 females age 18 and over, there were 101.1 males.

The homeowner vacancy rate was 2.6%; the rental vacancy rate was 4.1%.  4,823 people (74.8% of the population) lived in owner-occupied housing units and 1,622 people (25.2%) lived in rental housing units.

2000
As of the census of 2000, there were 4,135 people, 1,302 households, and 1,076 families residing in the CDP. The racial makeup of the CDP was 75.6% White, 2.1% African American, 1.0% Native American, 1.3% Asian, <0.1% Pacific Islander, 16.9% from other races, and 3.2% from two or more races. Hispanic or Latino of any race were 29.4% of the population.

There were 1,302 households, out of which 42.2% had children under the age of 18 living with them, 69.4% were married couples living together, 9.0% had a female householder with no husband present, and 17.3% were non-families. 13.1% of all households were made up of individuals, and 6.0% had someone living alone who was 65 years of age or older.  The average household size was 3.2 and the average family size was 3.5.

In the CDP, the population was spread out, with 32.4% under the age of 18, 6.9% from 18 to 24, 27.4% from 25 to 44, 22.0% from 45 to 64, and 11.3% who were 65 years of age or older.  The median age was 36 years. For every 100 females, there were 99.8 males.  For every 100 females age 18 and over, there were 97.0 males.

The median income for a household in the CDP was $49,129, and the median income for a family was $51,059. Males had a median income of $40,321 versus $26,337 for females. The per capita income for the CDP was $17,897.  About 7.3% of families and 10.2% of the population were below the poverty line, including 15.5% of those under age 18 and 6.2% of those age 65 or over.

Government
Nuevo is in an unincorporated area and falls under the jurisdiction of Riverside County. Being unincorporated, Nuevo has no formal local government such as a mayor, city council, or treasurer.

References

External links
olivegrovechurch.org
calvarynuevo.org

Census-designated places in Riverside County, California
Perris, California
Census-designated places in California